Edgar Tinkler (11 March 1921 – 14 November 2011), known as Ted, is a former English first-class cricketer who played in three matches. His debut was for Worcestershire in 1953 and two more for Marylebone Cricket Club (MCC) in the early 1960s.

External links
Statistical summary from CricketArchive
Lists of matches and detailed statistics for Ted Tinkler from CricketArchive

English cricketers
Worcestershire cricketers
Marylebone Cricket Club cricketers
1921 births
2001 deaths
Cricketers from Burnley